Cape Anne is a cape which marks the southeast extremity of Coulman Island, located in the Ross Sea near the coast of Victoria Land. Discovered in January 1841 by Sir James Clark Ross and named by him for his wife.

Headlands of Victoria Land
Borchgrevink Coast